Poggenhagen is a railway station of category six located in , a borough of Neustadt am Rübenberge, Germany. The station is located on the busy Bremen–Hanover railway and was opened in 1908; the last upgrade was for the launch of the Hanover S-Bahn in 2000, whose line S2 serves the station hourly.

Passing sidings on the western side of the station are also used to run a non-electrified spur to nearby Wunstorf Air Base, but traffic on this spur is very infrequent in recent years. Historically, the spur was of major importance to transport goods to the base during the Berlin Airlift of 1948/1949.

Miscellaneous
The two side platforms, each able to accommodate 3-car trains of the Hanover S-Bahn, are offset so that trains stop past the level crossing in order to allow for an easier flow of car traffic.

References

Railway stations in Lower Saxony
Hannover S-Bahn stations
Railway stations in Germany opened in 1908